The Robert Award for Best Actor in a Leading Role is a Danish Film Academy award presented at the annual Robert Award ceremony to recognize an actor who has delivered an outstanding leading performance in a Danish film.

Honorees

1980s 
 1984: Jesper Klein for Beauty and the Beast
 1985: Lars Simonsen for Twist and Shout
 1986: Reine Brynolfsson for 
 1987:  for 
 1988: Max von Sydow for Pelle the Conqueror
 1989: Börje Ahlstedt for

1990s 
 1990: Frits Helmuth for Waltzing Regitze
 1991: Tommy Kenter for Dance of the Polar Bears
 1992: Ole Lemmeke for 
 1993: Søren Østergaard for Pain of Love
 1994: Frits Helmuth for Stolen Spring
 1995: Ernst-Hugo Järegård for The Kingdom
 1996: Ulf Pilgaard for 
 1997: Thomas Bo Larsen for The Biggest Heroes
 1998: Lars Simonsen for Barbara
 1999: Ulrich Thomsen for The Celebration

2000s 
 2000: Niels Olsen for The One and Only
 2001: Jesper Christensen for The Bench
 Anders W. Berthelsen nominated for Italian for Beginners
 Søren Pilmark nominated for Flickering Lights
 Thure Lindhardt nominated for A Place Nearby
 Bjarne Henriksen nominated for 
 2002: Nikolaj Lie Kaas for Truly Human
 Martin Buch nominated for Chop Chop
 Lars Mikkelsen nominated for Kira's Reason: A Love Story
 Mads Mikkelsen nominated for Shake It All About
 Jens Okking nominated for One-Hand Clapping
 2003: Jens Albinus for Facing the Truth
 Kim Bodnia nominated for Old Men in New Cars
 Jørgen Kiil nominated for Minor Mishaps
 Troels Lyby nominated for Okay
 Mads Mikkelsen nominated for Open Hearts
 2004: Ulrich Thomsen for The Inheritance
 Lars Brygmann nominated for Stealing Rembrandt
 Nikolaj Coster-Waldau nominated for 
  nominated for 
 Nikolaj Lie Kaas nominated for The Green Butchers
 2005: Mads Mikkelsen for Pusher II
 Mikael Birkkjær nominated for Aftermath
 Frits Helmuth nominated for Villa Paranoia
 Mikael Persbrandt nominated for Day and Night
 Ulrich Thomsen nominated for Brothers
 2006: Troels Lyby for Accused
 Jesper Christensen nominated for Manslaughter
 Bjarne Henriksen nominated for Kinamand
 Nikolaj Lie Kaas nominated for Murk
 Ulrich Thomsen nominated for Adam's Apples
 2007: David Dencik for A Soap
 Jens Albinus nominated for The Boss of It All
 Nicolas Bro nominated for Offscreen
 Mads Mikkelsen nominated for After the Wedding
 Mads Mikkelsen nominated for Prague
 2008: Lars Brygmann for 
 Anders W. Berthelsen nominated for Just Another Love Story
 Kim Bodnia nominated for Echo
 David Dencik nominated for 
 Søren Pilmark nominated for 
 2009: Jakob Cedergren for Terribly Happy
 Anders W. Berthelsen nominated for What No One Knows
 Carsten Bjørnlund nominated for 
 Thure Lindhardt nominated for Flame & Citron
 Ulrich Thomsen nominated for Fear Me Not

2010s 
 2010: Lars Mikkelsen for Headhunter
 Willem Dafoe nominated for Antichrist
 Thomas Ernst nominated for Aching Hearts
 Kristian Halken nominated for Oldboys
 Cyron Melville nominated for Love and Rage
 2011: Pilou Asbæk for R
 Jens Albinus nominated for Everything Will Be Fine
 Jakob Cedergren nominated for Submarino
 Mads Mikkelsen nominated for Valhalla Rising
 Mikael Persbrandt nominated for In a Better World
 2012: Nikolaj Lie Kaas for A Funny Man
 Anders W. Berthelsen nominated for Rosa Morena
 Anders W. Berthelsen nominated for SuperClásico
 Nicolas Bro nominated for 
 Nikolaj Lie Kaas nominated for A Family
 2013: Søren Malling for A Hijacking
 2014: Mads Mikkelsen for The Hunt
 2015:  for Klumpfisken
 2016: Ulrich Thomsen for Sommeren '92
 Mads Mikkelsen nominated for Men & Chicken
 Peter Plaugborg nominated for The Idealist
 Pilou Asbæk nominated for A War
 Roland Møller nominated for Land of Mine
 2017: Søren Malling for Parents
 2018:  for Winter Brothers
 2019: Jakob Cedergren for The Guilty

2020s 
 2020: Esben Smed for Daniel
 2021: Mads Mikkelsen for Another Round

See also 

 Bodil Award for Best Actor in a Leading Role

References

External links 
  

1984 establishments in Denmark
Awards established in 1984
Film awards for lead actor
Actor in a Leading Role